Máirtín Ó Muilleoir ( Martin Millar; born 31st December 1959) is an Irish Sinn Féin politician, author, publisher and businessman, who served as the 58th Lord Mayor of Belfast (2013–14).

Early life and education
Ó Muilleoir was educated at St Mary's Christian Brothers' Grammar School, Belfast and at Queen's University Belfast.

Career

Business career
In 1997, Ó Muilleoir became part-owner of the Andersonstown News, which subsequently purchased the New York-based Irish Echo. A fluent Irish speaker, he has interests in other Irish and American businesses. He served as a temporary director of Northern Ireland Water.

Political career
Ó Muilleoir entered politics in 1985, when he stood as a Sinn Féin candidate for the Upper Falls area and narrowly missed out on being elected.

When Pip Glendinning of the Alliance Party resigned her seat two years later due to the birth of the Glendinning's daughter, Ó Muilleoir won the resulting by-election in October 1987. During his time on the council, he initiated a number of legal actions over what he claimed was discrimination by the Unionist-dominated council, detailing these experiences in his book, The Dome of Delight.

He was re-elected at the 1989 and 1993 local elections, retiring at the 1997 local elections to concentrate on his business interests. In 1996 he was an unsuccessful candidate in the Northern Ireland Forum election in North Down.

He re-entered politics in 2011, when he was elected as a Belfast City Councillor for Balmoral, South Belfast, gaining the seat previously held by Jim Kirkpatrick of the Democratic Unionist Party, and was elected Lord Mayor in 2013, serving a one-year term.

In 2014, he was co-opted as an MLA into the Northern Ireland Assembly. He stood in Belfast South in the 2015 United Kingdom general election, losing to the Social Democratic and Labour Party incumbent, Alasdair McDonnell. On 12 May 2016, he was appointed Minister of Finance in the Northern Ireland Executive. He resigned as an MLA in December 2019, and Deirdre Hargey was co-opted in his place.

References

External links
 Profile, companieshouse.gov.uk; accessed 9 December 2016.
 Profile, heraldscotland.com; accessed 25 February 2017.

1959 births
Date of birth missing (living people)
Living people
Irish publishers (people)
Lord Mayors of Belfast
Sinn Féin MLAs
Northern Ireland MLAs 2011–2016
Northern Ireland MLAs 2016–2017
Northern Ireland MLAs 2017–2022
People educated at St. Mary's Christian Brothers' Grammar School, Belfast
Alumni of Queen's University Belfast
Ministers of the Northern Ireland Executive (since 1999)
Sinn Féin councillors in Northern Ireland
Members of Belfast City Council
Sinn Féin parliamentary candidates
Ministers of Finance and Personnel of Northern Ireland